Fire Station No. 18 (also known as the Ballard Firehouse) was a fire station located in the Ballard neighborhood of Seattle, Washington listed on the National Register of Historic Places. It is now used as a nightclub and music venue.

See also
 List of landmarks in Seattle
 List of National Historic Landmarks in Washington (state)
 National Register of Historic Places listings in Seattle

References

External links
 

1910s architecture in the United States
1911 establishments in Washington (state)
Ballard, Seattle
Buildings and structures in Seattle
Fire stations completed in 1911
Fire stations on the National Register of Historic Places in Washington (state)
National Register of Historic Places in Seattle
Seattle Fire Department